The list of ship commissionings in 1893 includes a chronological list of all ships commissioned in 1893.


See also 

1893
 Ship commissionings